EMS/Natal/Fundação Universitária Vida Cristã,  EMS Natal FUNVIC or simply Vôlei Natal, is a Brazilian professional volleyball team based in Natal, Rio Grande do Norte, Brazil. They compete in the Brazilian Superliga.

Achievements
South American Club Championship
  (x1) 2016
Brazilian Superliga
  (x2) 2018–19, 2019-2020
  (x1) 2016–17
  (x2) 2014–15, 2015–16
 Brazilian Cup
  (x2) 2015, 2017

Team roster
Team roster – season 2019/2020

References

External links
 Official website
 Team profile in Superliga 2015/2016 - CBV
 Funvic Taubaté in voleibrasil.org

Brazilian volleyball clubs
Sports teams in São Paulo